Yahmul is a village in northern Aleppo Governorate, northwestern Syria. Traveler Martin Hartmann noted the village as a Turkish village in late 19th century.

The village administratively belongs to Nahiya Azaz in Azaz District. Nearby localities include Nayarah  to the northwest, and Jarez  to the southeast. In the 2004 census, Yahmul had a population of 612.

References

Populated places in Syria